"A Dustland Fairytale" is a song by American rock band The Killers, released as the fourth single from the band's third studio album, Day & Age (2008).  The Killers performed the song live on The Late Show with David Letterman accompanied by an orchestra in 2009.

The song's lyrics focus upon frontman Brandon Flowers' parents, referring to "Cinderella" (his mother) and a "slick chrome American prince" (his father).

Background
In 2013, vocalist Brandon Flowers noted that the track's lyrical content and aesthetic is similar to that of the band's previous studio album, Sam's Town: "["A Dustland Fairytale"] is me not being completely able to let go of Sam's Town! I wanted to - I wanted to go in a new direction, and there were a lot of new sounds on Day & Age, but on that song, I was really holding onto the last record. I still love Sam's Town, and you can really hear it in the words and sentiment of that song. It's more like an extension of Sam's Town, and not a reaction to it. It's one of the more personal narratives I've written, and it seems like the more personal I get, the more the fans respond and grow attached to the song."

2021 version

A recording released June 16, 2021 under the shortened name "Dustland" features Bruce Springsteen singing in the second verse, both choruses and the bridge, accompanied by Brandon Flowers singing in the first and second verse along with the second chorus and bridge.

Artwork
The cover art for the single is a portrait of the band's bassist Mark Stoermer, and is one of the four portraits drawn by Paul Normansell for the album.

Track listing
UK 7" picture disc
"A Dustland Fairytale" – 3:45
"Forget About What I Said" – 2:57

UK digital EP
"A Dustland Fairytale" – 3:45
"A Dustland Fairytale" (video) – 5:09

Chart performance
In December 2008, "A Dustland Fairytale" charted in the UK Top 200 on album track downloads alone, at number 158, in the week of its official release it re-entered at 137.

Music video
The video was directed by Anthony Mandler who also directed Killers videos for "Tranquilize" and "When You Were Young". It was released on US iTunes on June 8, 2009.

The video premiered in the UK on June 16 on Channel 4 and 4Music.

The video's style references the cult classic movie The Outsiders. The video starts with an old man named Joe White, smoking with a tattoo of the number 7 on one of his fingers. It then reflects on a younger man, "Joey", showing the same 7 on the finger, dressed in a leather jacket, white shirt and leather pants and about to fight a member of another gang, "Billy", for his own gang, the "Sevens". Throughout the video, it shows the boy, Joey, dating a brunette girl, then there is a flashback of Joey looking at the brunette girl through her window, while it shows the older man going to all the locations shown, reflecting on the memories of his youth. Interspersed with this is a letter that the man has, showing that he has just been released from prison, which gives a clue to the result of the initial fight—he kills Billy. The final shot is of an older Joe visiting a house, ringing the doorbell to find an older brunette woman answer the door, and they embrace.

Release history
The song was released as the third single from the band's third studio album Day & Age in North America. In the UK, Europe and Australia, the third single released was "The World We Live In".

References

2009 singles
The Killers songs
Songs written by Brandon Flowers
Songs written by Dave Keuning
Songs written by Ronnie Vannucci Jr.
Songs written by Mark Stoermer
Music videos directed by Anthony Mandler
Song recordings produced by Stuart Price
2008 songs
Island Records singles